Louis Anthony Dermot Walsh (born 5 August 2000) is an English professional footballer who plays as a winger for Slough Town.

Career

Early career
Walsh signed for Barnsley in July 2018, having previously been on trial with the club. He moved on loan to Guiseley in November 2018 for a month, making 5 league and 5 cup appearances for the club.

Southend United
After leaving Barnsley in April 2019 he went on trial with Nottingham Forest. He signed for Southend United in December 2020 on an 18-month contract. Walsh scored once in sixteen appearances in all competitions for the Shrimpers.

Barnet
Walsh joined Barnet on a permanent contract on 16 February 2022. In July 2022, Walsh, along with team-mate Aymen Azaze, joined Beaconsfield Town on loan. In November 2022, he joined Banbury United on a one-month loan. He left the Bees by mutual consent in December 2022.

Slough Town
Walsh signed for Slough Town in December 2022.

Playing style
Former club Barnsley said of Walsh that "blessed with incredible acceleration and terrific technique, the flying winger ghosts past defenders with consummate ease and frequently provides teammates with assists while contributing with goals too".

Career statistics

References

2000 births
Living people
People from Aylesbury Vale
English footballers
Barnsley F.C. players
Guiseley A.F.C. players
Southend United F.C. players
Barnet F.C. players
Beaconsfield Town F.C. players
Banbury United F.C. players
Slough Town F.C. players
National League (English football) players
English Football League players
Southern Football League players
Association football wingers